The 2012 Hong Kong Sevens was the 37th edition of the Hong Kong Sevens tournament and the sixth tournament of the 2011–12 IRB Sevens World Series. The host stadium was the Hong Kong Stadium.

Fiji won the title by defeating New Zealand 35–28 in the final.

Format
The teams were divided into pools of four teams, who played a round-robin within the pool. Points were awarded in each pool on a different scale from that used in most rugby tournaments: 3 for a win, 2 for a draw, 1 for a loss.

However, new for 2012 was what was described by organisers as two separate 12-team competitions, called Competition 1 and Competition 2. Competition 1 contained the 12 core teams of the IRB Sevens circuit, who play in every event of the IRB Sevens circuit, in pools A, B and C.

Competition 2 contained 12 teams who had qualified through their performance in regional tournaments, in pools D, E and F. Four of these teams were from Asia; three from Europe; two from North America & Caribbean; one from Oceania; one from South America; and one from Africa.  This competition also doubled as a qualifying tournament for the 2012–13 IRB Sevens circuit, where the two Qualifier (Shield) finalists and the winner of the 3rd/4th place playoff earned automatic participation in all events of the 2012–13 season. This resulted from the IRB's decision to increase the number of core teams to 15, effective in 2012–13.

Eight teams from Pools A, B and C, being the winners and runner-up from each pool, plus the best two 3rd placers, qualified for the Cup Quarter Finals. The losers of these Quarter Finals competed in the Plate Semifinals. The remaining four teams competed in the Bowl Semifinals.

Similarly, eight teams from Pools D, E and F qualified for the Qualifier (Shield) playoffs. The remaining four teams played in ranking matches.

Merchandising
For this tournament, sportswear brand Kukri Sports teamed up with Hong Kong lifestyle retail store G.O.D. to produce merchandising. The products, carried the specially designed "Kukri x G.O.D." logo, which features elements of the original Hong Kong flag, and ranges from polos, traditional Chinese jackets, boxers, Cheongsam-inspired ladies polo, messenger and tote bags. A percentage of sales went to the Foodlink Foundation, supported by both companies.

Teams
24 teams participated:

Competition 1

Competition 2

Pool stage
The draw was made on February 16.

Pool A

Pool B

Pool C

Pool D

Pool E

Pool F

Knockout stage

Cup

Plate

Bowl

Qualifier (Shield)

Ranking Matches

References

External links

2012
rugby union
2011–12 IRB Sevens World Series
2012 in Asian rugby union
March 2012 sports events in Asia